Currie is an unincorporated community in Elko County, Nevada, United States. It is often considered a ghost town, and its population is around 20.

The town is named after Joseph Currie, who started a ranch there in 1885. Discovery of copper in the neighboring town of Ely prompted the building of a railroad from Ely to the Southern Pacific main-line, at Cobre, Nevada. Currie is the midpoint between the two towns. On March 22, 1906, the first passenger train from Cobre to Currie was operated. Between 1906 and 1941, approximately 4.6 million passengers passed through Currie on rail.

The Ely copper smelters were closed on June 20, 1983 and the railroad closed one day later.

The major portion of the town, the business district (20 acres), is owned by Glenn, Robert, and wife Brenda Taylor, who now reside in Utah. It consists of Goshute Mercantile, the bar, adjoining house, cabins, RV park, garage, historic buildings, and corrals.  There is also the Nevada Northern Railway, Elko County School District - Currie Elementary school, Lear Ranch and the Nevada Highway Department.  The Taylors wish to sell their part of the town.

References

External links 

 A Brief Currie History

Unincorporated communities in Elko County, Nevada
Unincorporated communities in Nevada
Elko, Nevada micropolitan area
Populated places established in 1885